The Battle of Toulouse (10 April 1814) was one of the final battles of the Napoleonic Wars, four days after Napoleon's surrender of the French Empire to the nations of the Sixth Coalition. Having pushed the demoralised and disintegrating French Imperial armies out of Spain in a difficult campaign the previous autumn, the Allied British-Portuguese and Spanish army under the Duke of Wellington pursued the war into southern France in the spring of 1814.

Toulouse, the regional capital, proved stoutly defended by Marshal Soult. One British and two Spanish divisions were badly mauled in bloody fighting on 10 April, with Allied losses exceeding French casualties by 3,000. Soult held the city for an additional day before orchestrating an escape from the town with his army, leaving behind some 1,600 of his wounded, including three generals.

Wellington's entry on the morning of 12 April was acclaimed by a great number of French Royalists, validating Soult's earlier fears of potential fifth column elements within the city. That afternoon, the official word of Napoleon's abdication and the end of the war reached Wellington. Soult agreed to an armistice on 17 April.

Prelude

Following their successful invasion of France earlier in the year, an allied army of the Sixth Coalition, composed of British, Portuguese and Spanish troops under the supreme command of the Field Marshal Arthur Wellesley, Marquess of Wellington, laid siege to the city of Toulouse, one of the few remaining urban centres in France still loyal to Napoleon.

The city of Toulouse was garrisoned by around 42,000 French troops, under the command of Marshal Jean-de-Dieu Soult, Duke of Dalmatia. Imperial forces across southern France were greatly demoralised by fighting the Anglo-Allied forces in their own country, and were further shaken by news of repeated Coalition victories in northern and eastern France. Allied campaigning had gradually pushed French forces out of Spain during 1813, after endless guerrilla wars which had resulted in more than 300,000 French casualties between 1808 and late 1813. The French suffered greater losses in manpower in southern France, as Napoleon diverted many southern forces to bolster his troops facing the Coalition armies invading northern and eastern France after an allied victory at Leipzig in October 1813.

Preliminary operations

Orthez
After Soult's defeat by Wellington at the Battle of Orthez in late February 1814, the French Marshal retreated north behind the river Adour to Saint-Sever. Soult was on the horns of a dilemma. He could defend Bordeaux to the north-west or Toulouse to the east, but he could not protect both. The French army would have difficulty obtaining food near Bordeaux and it would place the river Garonne in their rear. Therefore, Soult elected to base himself on Toulouse.

Bordeaux
With Soult moving east, Wellington sent Beresford and two divisions to seize Bordeaux, the third-largest city of France. To make up for this subtraction of strength, the British general called up 8000 Spanish infantry and the British heavy cavalry as reinforcements. Fearful that the Spanish would plunder the French countryside and incite a guerrilla war, Wellington put his allies on the British payroll and supply system. Meanwhile, the British-Portuguese-Spanish army pushed the French out of Aire-sur-l'Adour on 2 March in a skirmish. Soult pulled back to Plaisance and Maubourguet, facing west. A ten-day lull followed, during which time Wellington's reinforcements began to arrive.

On 12 March, Beresford captured Bordeaux without resistance. Leaving the 7th Division as a garrison, he rushed back to join Wellington with the 4th Division. Meanwhile, on 17–18 March, in a raid with 100 French cavalrymen, Captain Dauma circled the Allied army's south flank and attacked Saint-Sever where he captured 100 men. At the same time, Wellington launched his offensive, hoping to ensnare Soult's army. By rapidly marching east to Saint-Gaudens and north-east to Toulouse, the French avoided the British flanking columns. Reaching Toulouse, Soult placed his soldiers behind the city's walls and fortifications.

Initial moves
On 4April, Wellington's engineers threw a pontoon bridge across the flooding Garonne north of the French city. After 19,000 Anglo-Allies crossed, the bridge gave way, trapping the men for three days. But Soult failed to take advantage of his opportunity to defeat Wellington's army in detail. On 8April, in a fine charge, the British 18th Hussars under Lieutenant-colonel Sir Henry Murray seized the bridge at Croix d'Orade on the Hers. Meanwhile, on 7April at midnight, the official couriers left Paris with news that Napoleon had abdicated and that the war was over.

French defences

Toulouse lies on the Garonne, which runs into the city from the south-west, then turns and exits to the north-west. Just east of the Garonne, the smaller Hers-Mort (Hers) runs past the city from the south-east to the north-east, forming a narrow corridor. To attack the city from the north, Wellington's main force would have to cross to the east bank of the Garonne, then drive south-east down the corridor between the two rivers.

West of the Garonne lies the fortified suburb of St-Cyprien. To the north, Soult's outer defence line rested on the Languedoc Canal. Three bridges crossed the canal, at Pont Jumeaux to the north-west, Pont des Minimes to the north and Pont de Matabiau to the north-east. Each crossing was commanded by a powerful redoubt. The Heights of Calvinet (Mont Rave) rose east of the city and west of the Hers River. The Heights were crowned with several redoubts. Soult held St-Cyprien with one division and the canal line with another division. Jean-Pierre Travot's conscripts lined the city walls. Jean Darmagnac's division stood between the Heights and the canal. The divisions of Jean Isidore Harispe and Eugene-Casimir Villatte defended the Heights with Eloi Taupin's division in reserve. Pierre Soult's cavalry screened to the east and south. (The battlefield is now within the modern city of Toulouse.)

Battle

Wellington began his attack on Easter Sunday, 10 April. Hoping to divert some of Soult's forces, the British general sent Hill with the 12,600 men of the 2nd Division and Portuguese Division to attack St-Cyprien. The rest of the Anglo-Allied army (36,000) operated east of the Garonne and north of the city. The 3rd Division faced the north-west canal line with the Light Division to the east. Wellington planned to make his major effort against the Heights of Calvinet. Beresford would take the 4th and 6th Divisions and the Hussar brigades down the west bank of the Hers. Once he reached a point east of the city, Beresford would veer west and attack the Heights with the Hussars protecting his south flank. At the same time, Freire would assault the northern end of the Heights with his two Spanish divisions. Two heavy dragoon brigades waited in reserve.

Initial attacks
To the west, Hill drove in the French outposts but the fighting was not serious. His forces suffered about 80 casualties. Exceeding his orders, Thomas Picton mounted a full-scale attack on the Pont Jumeaux with his 3rd Division and was repulsed with 400 casualties. Meanwhile, Beresford's men encountered muddy fields and fell behind schedule. Unable to move his artillery, he ordered the cannons to take a position near the northern end of the Heights and open fire. Freire, thinking this was the signal for the combined attack, sent his men to assault the Heights. The Spanish infantry forged uphill and gained a momentary foothold in a road cut, but they were counter-attacked by a cloud of French skirmishers and soon sent fleeing. Covered by the Light Division, the Spanish foot soldiers rallied, then attacked and were defeated a second time.

Taking the heights
At last, Beresford's two Anglo-Portuguese divisions reached their jumping off positions, with the 6th Division leading. A French division counter-attacked, but was easily driven uphill. "A shower of Congreve rockets at very close range threw the French into disorder; Rey's Brigade was routed and this, in turn, caused Gasquet's Brigade to fall back in disorder" The Allied divisions began to advance up the slope. They fought their way to the top of the Heights despite bitter resistance, then paused to drag up some cannon. Swinging to the north, they began rolling up the French defences. Beresford's men captured two redoubts, lost them to a counterattack and finally seized them again after bringing the 4th Division forward.  The heights being lost, Soult withdrew his soldiers behind the city's fortifications.

Soult held Toulouse during the day of 11 April but decided to pull out of the city upon detecting allied cavalry moving up the Toulouse-Carcassonne road. At 9 pm that evening, the French withdrew out of Toulouse by the Carcassonne road.

Aftermath
On the morning of 12 April a delegation of city officials handed over the city to the Allied army. That afternoon, Wellington got news via Bordeaux from Frederick Ponsonby of Napoleon's abdication. A few hours later in the evening, this was confirmed when the official couriers arrived from Paris. Wellington sent them on at once to Soult.

Casualties
The Allied army suffered 4,558 casualties, including 1,900 from Freire's divisions and 1,500 from the 6th Division. Brigade commanders Denis Pack, James Douglas, and Thomas Brisbane were wounded. French casualties numbered 231 officers and 3,005 men, including Taupin killed.

Armistice
On 13 April while on his march from Villefranche to Castelnaudary the Marshal was caught up by the officers from Paris. They were met with a rebuff – Soult declared himself not convinced of the authenticity of their credentials. He definitely refused to acknowledge the provisional regime till he should have, what he considered, solid evidence of its legality. On receiving Soult's refusal to acknowledge the Provisional Government, Wellington sent him on 14 April a reply to the effect that no armistice would be granted until he made his submission; it was suspected that the Marshal wished to keep his army under his own hand for the purpose of Napoleonic intrigues. By 15 April Marshal Suchet at Perpignan had accepted the evidence, placed himself at the disposition of the new government and asked Wellington for an armistice.

The last major action of the war occurred on 14 April at the Battle of Bayonne, when the French commander Thouvenot led a sortie from the besieged city against the Allied lines.

On 17 April, Soult at last received a dispatch from Berthier which formally announced the Emperor's abdication and consequent cessation of hostilities in all quarters. There was nothing more to be done and, the same day, his chief-of-staff went to Toulouse to sign an armistice, ending the fighting in the south. The city was briefly placed under Coalition control during the summer of 1814, with the withdrawal of allied troops in September.

Commentary
Both British and French historians claimed victory for their respective nations. The French claimed victory because Wellington failed to accomplish his aims of entrapping the French army, whilst Soult never intended to hold this position but to merely dispute it, intending to unite with Marshal Suchet before attacking Wellington's army: the taking of Toulouse amounted to very little, whilst the French lost one of their positions but their army was not defeated, causing Wellington to waste supplies and suffer heavy casualties. The British claimed victory because Toulouse ended up in their hands and the French were forced to give up ground. In addition, the British took one gun on the heights and the French abandoned others when they left Toulouse (the taking or loss of guns being often taken by contemporaries as a sign of victory or defeat).

Explanatory notes

Notes

References

Further reading

External links 
 Dispatches: London Gazette, 26 April 1814
 Battle of Toulouse

Battles of the Peninsular War
Battles of the Napoleonic Wars
Battles involving the United Kingdom
Battles involving Portugal
Battles involving France
Battles in Occitanie
Battle of Toulouse (1814)
Battle of Toulouse (1814)
King's German Legion
Battle honours of the King's Royal Rifle Corps
April 1814 events
Battles inscribed on the Arc de Triomphe
Arthur Wellesley, 1st Duke of Wellington
Toulouse